Vijayasena (Brahmi 𑀯𑀺𑀚𑀬𑀲𑁂𑀦 reigned 238-250) was a Saka ruler of the Western Satraps in India during the 2nd century CE. He was one of 4 sons of Damasena that ascended to the throne. In 242 CE, he was usurped by Isvaradatta, and regained the throne about a year and a half later. He was succeeded by his brother, Damajadasri III.

References

Western Satraps